The C Spire Ferriss Trophy was created in the fall of 2003 by the Mississippi Sports Hall of Fame to honor the Mississippi Collegiate Baseball Player of the Year. The trophy bears the name and likeness of Dave Ferriss. The trophy is cosponsored by C Spire Wireless.

Winners

Trophies won by school

Updated through 2021 results. ''Award was not presented in 2020 due to the COVID-19 shortened season

See also
Howell Trophy - award given annually to the best men's college basketball player in the state of Mississippi by the Mississippi Sports Hall of Fame.
Gillom Trophy - award given annually to the best women's college basketball player in the state of Mississippi by the Mississippi Sports Hall of Fame.
Conerly Trophy - an award given annually to the best college football player in the state of Mississippi by the Mississippi Sports Hall of Fame.
Hull Trophy- an award given annually to the best college offensive lineman in Mississippi by the Mississippi Sports Hall of Fame.

References

College baseball trophies and awards in the United States
Baseball in Mississippi
Awards established in 2003
2003 establishments in Mississippi